

The Cayman Trough (also known as the Cayman Trench, Bartlett Deep and Bartlett Trough) is a complex transform fault zone pull-apart basin which contains a small spreading ridge, the Mid-Cayman Rise, on the floor of the western Caribbean Sea between Jamaica and the Cayman Islands. It is the deepest point in the Caribbean Sea and forms part of the tectonic boundary between the North American Plate and the Caribbean Plate.  It extends from the Windward Passage, going south of the Sierra Maestra of Cuba toward Guatemala. The transform fault continues onshore as the Polochic-Motagua fault system, which consists of the Polochic and Motagua faults. This system continues on until the Chiapas massif where it is part of the diffuse triple junction of the North American, Caribbean and Cocos plates.

Within the trough is a slowly spreading north–south ridge which may be the result of an offset or gap of approximately  along the main fault trace. The Cayman spreading ridge shows a long-term opening rate of  The eastern section of the trough has been named the Gonâve Microplate. The Gonâve plate extends from the spreading ridge east to the island of Hispaniola. It is bounded on the north by the Oriente and Septentrional fault zones. On the south the Gonâve is bounded by the Walton fault zone, the Jamaica restraining bend and the Enriquillo-Plantain Garden fault zone. The two bounding strike slip fault zones are left lateral. The western section of the trough is bounded to its south by the Swan Islands Transform Fault.

During the Eocene the trough was the site of a subduction zone which formed the volcanic arc of the Cayman Ridge and the Sierra Maestra volcanic terrain of Cuba to the north, as the northeastward-moving Caribbean Plate was subducted beneath the southwest-moving North American Plate, or as some researchers contend, beneath a plate fragment dubbed the East Cuban Microplate.

In January 2012, the researchers announced that water exits the vents at a temperature possibly exceeding , making them among the hottest known undersea vents. They also announced the discovery of new species, including an eyeless shrimp with a light-sensing organ on its back.

See also
 Oceanic trench

References

Further reading
Goreau, P. D. E.  1983 Tectonic Evolution of the North Central Caribbean Plate Margin.  Woods Hole Oceanographic Institution, MA.; Massachusetts Inst. of Tech., Cambridge. Sponsor: National Science Foundation, Washington, DC. Sep 1983. 248p. Report: WHOI-83-34.
Ten Brink, Uri S., et al., 2001, Asymmetric seafloor spreading: crustal thickness variations and transitional crust in Cayman Trough from gravity", GSA Meeting Abstract
Roberts, H. H.  1994 Reefs and lagoons of Grand Cayman   Monographiae biologicae (Brunt, MA; Davies, JE eds).  Kluwer Academic Publishers, Boston, Ma The Hague. 
 Ruellan, E. et al., 2003, Morphology and Tectonics of the Mid-Cayman Spreading Center'', EGS - AGU - EUG Joint Assembly, Abstract
Scotese, Christopher R. 1999.  Evolution of the Caribbean Sea (100 mya - Present) Collision of Cuba with Florida Platform and Opening of the Cayman Trough. PALEOMAP Project http://www.scotese.com/caribanim.htm

Landforms of Cuba
Extreme points of Jamaica
Landforms of the Cayman Islands
Oceanic trenches of the Caribbean Sea
Plate tectonics
Cuba–Jamaica border
Borders of the Cayman Islands
Pull-apart basins
Structural basins
Tectonic landforms
Seismic faults of North America